Jeremy Mallais (born July 18, 1988) is a Canadian curler from Moncton, New Brunswick. He currently throws fourth stones on Team Scott Jones.

Career
Mallais finished second at the 2008 New Brunswick Tankard, losing the final to James Grattan 9–2. He also lost in the final in 2010 playing lead for Terry Odishaw and finished third in 2013 playing third for Jason Vaughan. He won his first Tankard title in 2015 at the 2015 Pepsi Tankard and went on to have a 2–9 record at the 2015 Tim Hortons Brier in Calgary.

He joined Team Scott Jones for the 2019–20 season. They won the Atlantic Superstore Monctonian Challenge and the Steele Cup Cash on the World Curling Tour and played in the 2019 Tour Challenge Tier 2 Grand Slam of Curling event. At provincials, they lost in the semifinal to Jason Roach.

Personal life
Mallais is married to fellow curler Sarah Mallais and they have three children. He works as a CPA for Deloitte.

Teams

References

External links

Curlers from New Brunswick
Living people
Sportspeople from Moncton
1988 births
Canadian male curlers
Sportspeople from Saint John, New Brunswick